Walter Hochschild (September 27, 1900 – February 1, 1983) was an American industrialist, having spent 63 years as an executive with the American Metal Company (later AMAX), founded by his father, Berthold Hochschild. He became president of the company in 1950 and chairman and chief executive officer in 1957.  He served as a trustee of the Museum of the City of New York for thirty years, and as a lifelong senior trustee of the United States Council of the International Chamber of Commerce. He was a member of the Council on Foreign Relations since 1947.

He built Eagle Nest camp in Blue Mountain Lake, New York, an Adirondack Great Camp.

Personal life
He was married to Kathrin Samstag Hochschild; they had three daughters: Patricia Hochschild Labalme, Lynn Hochschild Boillot, and Ann Hochschild Poole.

Sources
New York Times, Walter Hochschild, Headed American Metal Climax Inc, February 2, 1983.

References

American industrialists
American people of German-Jewish descent
1900 births
1983 deaths
American businesspeople in metals
Walter